Sir John Cunningham McLennan,  (October 14, 1867 – October 9, 1935) was a Canadian physicist.

Born in Ingersoll, Ontario, the son of David McLennan and Barbara Cunningham, he was the director of the physics laboratory at the University of Toronto from 1906 until 1932.

McLennan was elected a Fellow of the Royal Society in 1915. McLennan delivered the Guthrie lecture to the Physical Society in 1918. With his graduate student, Gordon Merritt Shrum, he built a helium liquefier at the University of Toronto. They were the second in the world to successfully produce liquid helium in 1923, 15 years after Heike Kammerlingh Onnes. In 1926, he was awarded the Royal Society of Canada's Flavelle Medal and in 1927 a Royal Medal.

He died in 1935 near Abbeville in France on a train from Paris to London of a heart attack. He is buried beside his wife in Stow of Wedale, Scotland.

References

Further reading
 University of Toronto biography
 John Cunningham McLennan at The Canadian Encyclopedia
John Cunningham McLennan archival papers held at the University of Toronto Archives and Records Management Services

1867 births
1935 deaths
Canadian physicists
Fellows of the Royal Society
Fellows of the Royal Society of Canada
Canadian Knights Commander of the Order of the British Empire
University of Toronto alumni
Academic staff of the University of Toronto
Royal Medal winners
People from Ingersoll, Ontario